The DTA Evolution is a French ultralight trike, designed and produced by DTA sarl of Montélimar. The aircraft is supplied as a complete ready-to-fly-aircraft.

Design and development
It features a cable-braced hang glider-style high-wing, weight-shift controls, a two-seats-in-tandem open cockpit without a cockpit fairing, tricycle landing gear with wheel pants and a single engine in pusher configuration.

The aircraft is made from bolted-together aluminum tubing, with its single surface wing covered in Dacron sailcloth. Its  span DTA Dynamic 16 wing is supported by a single tube-type kingpost and uses an "A" frame weight-shift control bar. The powerplant is a twin cylinder, air-cooled, two-stroke, dual-ignition  Rotax 503 engine, with the liquid cooled  Rotax 582, the four cylinder, air and liquid-cooled, four-stroke, dual-ignition  Rotax 912 or  Rotax 912S engines optional.

A number of different wings can be fitted to the basic carriage, including the DTA Dynamic, DTA Diva and the strut-braced DTA Magic.

Operational history
In September 2003 a French flying team flew an Evolution from Paris to Dakar, making use of the aircraft's high payload to carry all needed supplies.

Specifications (Evolution with Dynamic 16 wing)

References

External links

Evolution
2000s French sport aircraft
2000s French ultralight aircraft
Single-engined pusher aircraft
Ultralight trikes